Eremophila cordatisepala is a flowering plant in the figwort family, Scrophulariaceae and is endemic to areas of Queensland and the Northern Territory in Australia. It is a small grey shrub with purple to lilac-coloured flowers which have heart-shaped sepals at their base.

Description
Its leaves and branches are covered with a layer of greyish to yellowish branched hairs, but unlike others in the genus, lack resin glands and are not sticky or shiny.

There are 5 green to purple sepals which are hairy, lance-shaped to egg-shaped at first but enlarge as the flowers develop. The petal tube is purple to lilac-coloured outside and white with purple spots inside. The outside of the tube and the petal lobes are almost glabrous but the inside of the tube is filled with woolly hairs. The petal lobes are rounded but have a small point in their centres. The 4 stamens are fully enclosed within the tube.

Taxonomy and naming
Eremophila cordatisepala was first formally described by Lindsay Stuart Smith in 1956 and the description was published in Proceedings of the Royal Society of Queensland. The specific epithet is from the Latin cordati-, 'heart-shaped' and sepala, 'sepals'.

Distribution and habitat
This eremophila occurs in south-western Queensland and south-eastern Northern Territory where it usually grows on hillsides in red-brown clay soils.

Conservation status
Eremophila cordatisepala is classified as "near threatened" in the Northern Territory but as of "least concern" in Queensland.

Use in horticulture
A feature of this eremophila is its large sepals which, along with its silvery-grey leaves, help to make this small attractive shrub suitable as a container plant. It can be propagated from cuttings and grown in full sun or partial shrub in well-drained soil. It tolerates long dry spells but is damaged by severe frost.

References

cordatisepala
Plants described in 1956
Flora of Queensland